Anaerostipes rhamnosivorans  is a Gram-variable, strictly anaerobic, spore-forming, butyrate-producing and curly rod-shaped bacterium from the genus of Anaerostipes which has been isolated from the human faeces of an infant in the Netherlands.

References

External links
Type strain of Anaerostipes rhamnosivorans at BacDive -  the Bacterial Diversity Metadatabase	

Lachnospiraceae
Bacteria described in 2014